Whatcha Wearin'? (lit. My P.S. Partner) is a 2012 South Korean romantic comedy film, starring Ji Sung and Kim Ah-joong. It is about a woman who in an attempt to spice up her five-year relationship, tries to have phone sex with her boyfriend but accidentally gets another man on the line instead.

The film was released in theaters on December 6, 2012.

Plot
Instead of calling her boyfriend, Yoon-jung accidentally calls a total stranger, Hyun-seung, a man who is having trouble getting over his ex-girlfriend. She ends up having phone sex with him and later, they become comfortable with each other and start talking about their respective relationship problems. They eventually decide to meet and a more intimate friendship develops, which leads to both falling for each other.

Cast
Ji Sung - Hyun-seung
Kim Ah-joong - Yoon-jung  
Shin So-yul - So-yeon
Kang Kyung-joon - Seung-joon
Kim Sung-oh - Seok-woon
Moon Ji-yoon - Young-min
Jung Soo-young - Jin-joo
Kim Bo-mi - Yoon-mi
Kim Bo-yeon - Yoon-jung's mother
Ok Ji-young - Soo-jung
Lee Mi-so - Hye-rim
Hwang Seung-eon - Choi Young-ah
Kwak Ji-min - Ah-ra
Kim Joo-ryung - "sea turtle"-faced woman
Kim Joon-ho - restaurant waiter
Shin Hae-chul - himself (cameo)

Box office
Whatcha Wearin'? was the fastest rated-19 adult romantic comedy to hit the 1 million admissions mark, reaching its goal in only 10 days — a day faster than the previous record holders Sex Is Zero 2, My Scary Girl and Petty Romance. Total ticket sales amounted to 1,831,644, or a revenue of $12,376,644.

Awards and nominations
2013 49th Baeksang Arts Awards
Nomination - Best Supporting Actress - Shin So-yul

2013 50th Grand Bell Awards
Nomination - Best New Actress - Shin So-yul

References

External links
  
 
  
 

2012 films
South Korean sex comedy films
South Korean romantic comedy films
2012 romantic comedy films
Films about mobile phones
2010s sex comedy films
2010s Korean-language films
2010s South Korean films